Peter Patrick Gillespie (November 30, 1851 – May 4, 1910) was a left fielder in Major League Baseball from  to . Gillespie played for the Troy Trojans and New York Giants.

In 714 games over eight seasons, Gillespie posted a .276 batting average (809-for-2927) with 450 runs, 10 home runs and 351 RBI.

External links

1851 births
1910 deaths
Major League Baseball left fielders
Baseball players from Pennsylvania
New York Gothams players
New York Giants (NL) players
Troy Trojans players
19th-century baseball players
Guelph Maple Leafs players
Lynn Live Oaks players
Worcester (minor league baseball) players
Troy Trojans (minor league) players
Albany Governors players